The 1916 United States Senate election in Pennsylvania was held on November 7, 1916. Incumbent Republican U.S. Senator George T. Oliver was not a candidate for re-election. The Republican nominee, Philander C. Knox defeated Democratic nominee Ellis C. Orvis.

Knox died in October 1921, during his first term, and William E. Crow was appointed to fill the vacancy. Crow, however, also died before the expiration of the term, in August 1922. David A. Reed was appointed to fill the vacancy created by Crow's death, and was subsequently elected to complete the rest of the term expiring in March 1923 and to a full six-year term in his own right on the same day.

General election

Candidates
Herbert T. Ames (Prohibition)
Charles W. Ervin (Socialist)
Philander C. Knox, former U.S. Senator and United States Secretary of State (Republican)
Robert Colvin Macauley Jr. (Single Tax)
Ellis L. Orvis (Democratic)
William H. Thomas (Socialist Labor)

Results

References

Pennsylvania
1916
1916 Pennsylvania elections